Givira francesca is a moth in the family Cossidae. It is found in North America, where it has been recorded from Alabama, Florida, Mississippi, North Carolina and South Carolina.

The wingspan is 22–27 mm. Adults have been recorded on wing year round.

The larvae bore in the bark of Pinus trunks.

References

Natural History Museum Lepidoptera generic names catalog

Givira
Moths described in 1909